Truncatella subcylindrica is a species of small land snail that lives at the edge of the sea. It has gills and an operculum and is gastropod mollusk or micromollusk in the family Truncatellidae.

Description 

This species of snail has a shell which is light in color, and which can reach 5 mm in length.

Like all other species in this genus, the shell loses its apical whorls as it grows, giving it a truncated and cylindrical appearance.

Distribution 
This snail is native to areas of the northeastern Atlantic coastline, from Morocco and the Mediterranean coast to the Black Sea. This native distribution includes Great Britain.

There are also some early records from the late 1800s for the eastern United States, on the coast of Newport, Rhode Island, where it was presumably introduced.

Habitat 

This species is found in marine coastal environments, near or just above the high tide line on stones and pebbles, fine sediments and decomposing vegetation. It prefers the edge of sheltered waters where the salinity is at 18–40 psu.

Life cycle 
The sexes are separate. Fertilized eggs are laid as egg capsules, which are attached to detritus.

References
This article incorporates public domain text from the reference

 Locard, A. (1894). Description des mollusques quaternaires nouveaux recueillis aux environs de Crémieu (Isère) par M. le Dr Jaquemet. Annales de la Société Linnéenne de Lyon (N.S.). 41: 201-220.
 Rowson, B., Powell, H., Willing, M., Dobson, M. & Shaw, H. (2021). Freshwater Snails of Britain and Ireland. FSC Publications, Telford, UK.

External links 
 Linnaeus, C. (1767). Systema naturae per regna tria naturae: secundum classes, ordines, genera, species, cum characteribus, differentiis, synonymis, locis. Ed. 12. 1., Regnum Animale. 1 & 2. Holmiae 
 Monterosato, T. A. di. (1878). Note sur quelques coquilles provenant des côtes d'Algérie. Supplément. Journal de Conchyliologie. 26 (4): 313-321
 Issel, A. (1880). Crociera del Violante comandato dal capitano armatore Enrico d'Albertis dureante l'anno 1877. I. Parte narrativa (pp. 199-236). II. Risultati Scientifici. Cenni sulla geologia della Galita (pp. 237-258). Molluschi terrestri e d'acqua dolce, viventi e fossili (pp. 259-282). Annali del Museo civico di storia naturale di Genova. (1) 15: 199-282
 Scacchi, A. (1836). Catalogus conchyliorum Regni Neapolitani. Neapoli (Naples): Typis Filiatre-Sebetii. 18 p., 1 pl.
 Risso, A. (1826-1827). Histoire naturelle des principales productions de l'Europe Méridionale et particulièrement de celles des environs de Nice et des Alpes Maritimes. Paris, F.G. Levrault. 3(XVI): 1-480, 14 pls.
 Leach, W. E. (1852). Molluscorum Britanniae Synopsis. A synopsis of the Mollusca of Great Britain arranged according to their natural affinities and anatomical structure. Van Voorst, London, viii + 376 pp. (edited posthumously by J. E. Gray).
 ayraudeau, B. C. (1826). Catalogue descriptif et méthodique des annelides et des mollusques de l'Ile de Corse; avec huit planches représentant quatre-vingt-huit espèces, dont soixante-huit nouvelles. 218 pp. Paris
 Mousson, A. (1873). Diagnosen neuer Mollusken aus West-Marokko, von Dr. von Fritsch und Dr. Rein gesammelt. Malakozoologische Blätter. 21: 149-157. Cassel.
 Shuttleworth, R. J. (1852). Diagnosen einiger neuen Mollusken aus den Canarischen Inseln. Mittheilungen der Naturforschenden Gesellschaft in Bern. 1852 (241/242): 137-146. Bern
 Lowe, R. T. (1832). On the genera Melampus, Pedipes and Truncatella with experiments tending to demonstrate the nature of the respiratory organs of these Mollusca. Zoological Journal. 5: 280-305, pl. 13
 Montagu, G. (1803). Testacea Britannica or natural history of British shells, marine, land, and fresh-water, including the most minute: Systematically arranged and embellished with figures. J. White, London, Vol. 1, xxxvii + 291 pp;; Vol. 2, pp. 293–606, pl. 1-16
 Bucquoy, E., Dautzenberg, P. & Dollfus, G. (1882-1886). Les mollusques marins du Roussillon. Tome Ier. Gastropodes. Paris: Baillière & fils. 570 pp., 66 pls
  Serres, M. de. (1853). Note sur les dépôts diluviens, les sables et les marnes teriaires d'eau douce mis à découvert lors des fondations du Palais-de-Justice de Montpellier. Revue et magasin de zoologie pure et appliquée, 2e série. 5: 446-461, 557-565
 Gofas, S.; Le Renard, J.; Bouchet, P. (2001). Mollusca. in: Costello, M.J. et al. (eds), European Register of Marine Species: a check-list of the marine species in Europe and a bibliography of guides to their identification. Patrimoines Naturels. 50: 180-213
 Shuttleworth, R. J. (1854). Beiträge zur näheren Kenntniss der Land- und Süsswasser-Mollusken der Insel Portorico (Schluss). Mittheilungen der Naturforschenden Gesellschaft in Bern. 1854 (321/322): 89-103
 Smith, E. A. (1896). A list of the land and freshwater Mollusca of Trinidad. Journal of Conchology. 8: 231-251, pl. 8, London
 Martens, E. von. (1877). Land- und Süsswasser-Schnecken von Puerto Rico. Jahrbücher der Deutschen Malakozoologischen Gesellschaft. 4(3): 340-362, pl. 12
 Guppy, R. J. L. (1893). The land and freshwater Mollusca of Trinidad. Journal of Conchology. 7: 210-231

Truncatellidae
Molluscs of the Atlantic Ocean
Gastropods of Africa
Marine molluscs of Europe
Molluscs of the Black Sea
Molluscs of the Mediterranean Sea
Taxa named by Carl Linnaeus
Gastropods described in 1767